Finland–Yugoslavia relations were historical foreign relations between Finland and now split-up Kingdom of Yugoslavia or Socialist Federal Republic of Yugoslavia. Both countries gained their independence during or in the immediate aftermath of the World War I and the collapse of Austria-Hungary (Yugoslavia) or Russian Empire (Finland). Two parties established formal bilateral relations in 1928. Two countries developed their relations after the end of the World War II and 1948 Tito–Stalin split. At the time neither one of them was a part of either Eastern or Western Bloc in the Cold War divided Europe. Both countries perceived development of relations among non-bloc neutral European states as a way to avoid isolation and preserve certain level of independence without alienating major powers. Belgrade however perceived that in deeply divided Europe there was shrinking maneuvering space for neutral countries and followed the development of what will be called process of Finlandization with great concern. It therefore turned its focus on new allies among former colonies and mandate territories outside of Europe where it developed its policy of equidistant active neutrality via its activities in the newly founded Non-Aligned Movement.

Two countries developed noticeable cultural exchange from 1960s onward. The fact that ambitious small countries in periphery or semi-periphery such as Yugoslavia and Finland were frequently capable to use superpowers rivalries to its own disproportional advantage motivated some scholars of the era (e.g. Tvrtko Jakovina) to focus on what they called pericentric studies of Cold War.

Non-Aligned (Yugoslavia, Cyprus and Malta) and neutral (Finland, Switzerland, Austria and to extent Sweden) European countries continued to cooperate in effort to overcome the Cold War divisions in Europe. It was particularly case in their commitment to the Conference on Security and Co-operation in Europe which preceded the modern day Organization for Security and Co-operation in Europe. Helsinki served as the host city to the first conference which resulted in the Helsinki Accords with the first follow-up meeting being organized in Belgrade between 4 October 1977 and 8 March 1978. During and after the Yugoslav Wars Finland continued to play prominent role in trying to ensure peace and stability in Yugoslav successor states. Finland cooperated in NATO led Stabilisation Force in Bosnia and Herzegovina and Kosovo Force. Former President of Finland Martti Ahtisaari, as a politician from non-NATO member country, led Kosovo status process.

See also
Yugoslavia–European Communities relations
Group of Nine
Finno-Soviet Treaty of 1948
Finland–Serbia relations
Views on Enlargement of NATO in Finland and Serbia
Croatia–Finland relations
Death and state funeral of Josip Broz Tito
Yugoslavia at the 1952 Summer Olympics
Finland at the 1984 Winter Olympics
Finland–Soviet Union relations

Further reading
 Kullaa, Rinna (2012). Non-alignment and Its Origins in Cold War Europe: Yugoslavia, Finland and the Soviet Challenge. London; New York, N.Y.: I.B. Tauris.
 Statovci, Pajtim (2017). My Cat Yugoslavia. Helsinki: Otava.

References

Finland–Yugoslavia relations
Yugoslavia
Finland
Bosnia and Herzegovina–Finland relations
Croatia–Finland relations
Finland–Kosovo relations
Finland–Montenegro relations
Finland–North Macedonia relations
Finland–Serbia relations
Finland–Slovenia relations